Eddie Krawiec (born December 6, 1976 in Englishtown, New Jersey) is an NHRA Mello Yello Drag Racing Series Pro Stock Motorcycle racer. He currently pilots the #2 Buell Motorcycles Pro Stock bike for Vance & Hines as a teammate to 4-time Pro Stock Motorcycle champion Andrew Hines. Ed Krawiec, a former AMA Prostar racer, served as a full-time employee of Old Bridge Township Raceway Park from 1999 through 2007, and became dragstrip manager in 2001.
 
On November 16, 2008, Krawiec overcame a 19-point deficit to win his first NHRA Full Throttle Pro Stock Motorcycle championship by five points over second-place finisher Chris Rivas. Krawiec did this, despite never having won an official event in his career.   He is only the second NHRA driver to win a championship without winning an event in the same year. Rob Bruins won the Top Fuel title in 1979  going winless, but Bruins had won twice in 1978, though after that, he never won a race again. For Krawiec, this has changed. As of the start of the 2013 season, Krawiec now has 20 career wins in the Pro Stock Motorcycle division. In 2012, Krawiec captured his third NHRA title (and second consecutive title) at Auto Club Raceway in Pomona at the Automobile Club of Southern California NHRA Finals.  Eddie won his fourth Pro Stock motorcycle title in 2017.

External links
NHRA Press Release

1976 births
Living people
American motorcycle racers
People from Englishtown, New Jersey
Motorcycle drag racers